This is a list of active and extinct volcanoes in Cameroon.

References 

Cameroon
 
Volcanoes